Fabio Perini S.p.A. is an Italian engineering company specialized in machine design and manufacturing of industrial machinery for the paper making industry and the tissue converting industry. Fabio Perini S.p.A. is part of the international technology group Körber, and belongs to its division Körber Process Solutions. The management holding of the Körber Group, Körber AG, is located in Hamburg, Germany.

Brief history

Fabio Perini S.p.A. is a mechanical engineering company established in Lucca, Italy, in 1966 by the inventor/entrepreneur Fabio Perini. The company is specialized in design and manufacturing of industrial machinery for the paper making industry and the tissue converting industry.

Based in Lucca, the company has eleven overseas branches located in three continents (Europe, America and Asia).

Since 1994 Fabio Perini S.p.A. is part of the German technology group Körber, and belongs to the division Körber Process Solutions.

History

Fabio Perini and the Company rising

Fabio Perini starts his activity in 1960 when he invents a machinery for the automatic cut of tissue paper.

In 1966 he founds his company, the Fabio Perini, with a view to designing new engineering technologies and manufacturing industrial machinery for the tissue converting industry.

With the change and the improvement of lifestyles, the Italian tissue industry raises noticeably during the 1960s.

This fact favours Fabio Perini's company which grows up until 1973, when the company is turned into a Società per Azioni, becoming the Fabio Perini S.p.A..

Fabio Perini S.p.A.
Under the new form of Società per Azioni, Fabio Perini S.p.A. meets with a phase of international expansion. In the 1970s new offices are opened in Europe and America: two selling offices in Europe (Paris, 1974; Düsseldorf, 1976), one selling office in the United States (Green Bay, Wisconsin, 1978, at the Green Bay Engineering Company) and one manufacturing plant in Latin America (Joinville, Brazil, 1975).

During the '1980s and the '1990s further branches are opened in Asia (Yokohama, 1984; Hong Kong, 1985; Fuji, 1991), Europe (London, 1984) and United States (Miami, 1990).

In about 20 years, thanks to many original design patents, the company Fabio Perini transformed itself from a one-man business to a multinational enterprise able to cover up the 75% of the worldwide market of the paper making industry and the tissue converting machinery.

As acknowledgement of his entrepreneurship, in 1991 the founder Fabio Perini is ordered Knight of the Italian Republic, under the Order of Merit for Labour.

Entering the Körber Group

In 1994 the founder Fabio Perini sells his company to the German multinational group Körber.

Fabio Perini S.p.A. headquarters remains in Lucca, Italy.

After that, the growing of the company goes on; three new overseas branches are opened in Asia: two selling offices (Singapore, 1994; Seoul, 1995) and one manufacturing plant (Shanghai, 2002).

In 2003 Perini Engraving S.r.l. is opened in Lucca: Perini Engraving is a division of the Fabio Perini S.p.A. group specialized in the design and manufacturing of customized embossing rolls for tissue production.

Products
Some of the machinery designed and manufactured by Fabio Perini S.p.A. are:
Toilet roll and kitchen towel converting lines;
Table napkin converting equipment;
Embossers, laminators, printing units;
Slitter rewinders for the production of industrial rolls;
Customized embossing rolls for tissue production.

Publishing Activity
Since 1979 Fabio Perini S.p.A. publishes the Perini Journal, a six-monthly review completely dedicated to the tissue paper industry.

See also 

List of Italian companies
Fabio Perini
Körber Process Solutions
Perini Journal
Toilet roll
Table napkin
Kitchen Towel
Embossing
Tissue paper
Pulp and paper industry

References

External links
 Fabio Perini S.p.A. official website
Körber AG official website
  Procter & Gamble chooses Fabio Perini technology

Engineering companies of Italy
Industrial machine manufacturers
Manufacturing companies established in 1966
Italian companies established in 1966
Italian brands
Companies based in Tuscany
1994 mergers and acquisitions